East Asia Inter-Regional Tourism Forum was founded in Gangwon Province, Korea in 2000 in order to pursue for peace and prosperity through exchanges in diverse fields especially on tourism. Nine member countries from Northeast and Southeast Asian Provinces founded participated at the preliminary meeting in Seoul in September 1999 to form EATOF. It is the only international tourism association in East Asia, led by local governments. Currently, EATOF has 12 member provinces with the accession of Quảng Ninh Province in 2005 and Luang Prabang and Siem Riep in 2009.

Functions 
Each member is playing following roles to achieve goals of EATOF:
Exchange of information on tourism policy and tourism industry
Development of joint programs which promote tourism in individual provinces and the region as a whole
Training, education and exchange of personnel working in the tourism sector both private and public
Other matters related to mutual cooperation in tourism

History 

2000. 9.
After preliminary meeting, EATOF 2000 that is also called an inarguable meeting was held in Gangwon Province, Korea with participation of nine member provinces.

2006. 9
Quang Ninh Province in Vietnam became a new regular member, and then EATOF has consisted of ten member provinces.

2007. 9
At the EATOF 2007 in Chiang Mai Province agreed to establish EATOF Permanent Secretariat.

2008. 1
EATOF permanent secretariat has been established in Gangwon Province.

2009. 9.
Siem Reap in Cambodia and Luang Prabang in Laos became new regular members, and then EATOF has consisted of twelve member provinces.

Member Province

References

International organizations based in Asia
Organizations established in 2000